The 2014 AFL women's draft was the second national women's draft organised by the Australian Football League, held to select Melbourne and Western Bulldogs players for the Hampson-Hardeman Cup, an exhibition match. It was conducted on 19 May and consisted of 24 picks, with 12 players selected by each team. Teams were permitted to retain 12 players from the 2013 match, and completed their lists through the draft. Coastal Titans player Tiah Haynes was selected by the Bulldogs with the first pick. The Titans provided the most players in the draft, with five selected.

Draft

Retained players

12 players were selected to be retained by each team, barring unavailability.

Melbourne

 Kirby Bentley
 Ellie Blackburn
 Kiara Bowers
 Kara Donnellan
 Alicia Eva
 Courtney Gum
 Melissa Hickey
 Leah Kaslar
 Daisy Pearce
 Chelsea Randall
 Emma Swanson
 Bree White
 Lou Wotton

Western Bulldogs

 Lauren Arnell
 Katie Brennan
 Steph Chiocci
 Emma Kearney
 Elise O'Dea
 Aasta O'Connor
 Karen Paxman
 Kira Phillips
 Rebecca Privitelli
 Lauren Spark
 Nicola Stevens
 Louise Stephenson
 Natalie Wood

References

AFL women's draft
ADL women's draft
AFL women's draft
2010s in Melbourne
Australian rules football in Victoria (Australia)
Sport in Melbourne
Events in Melbourne